Oriental Orthodox Churches are the churches descended from those that rejected the Council of Chalcedon in 451. Despite the similar name, they are therefore a different branch of Christianity from the Eastern Orthodox. Oriental Orthodoxy consists of several autocephalous and autonomous jurisdictions holding a single set of beliefs and united in full communion. However, they each have their own separate rites, and there are significant differences between their respective practices. Thus, there is more internal diversity of practice among the Oriental Orthodox than among the Eastern Orthodox.

Distribution
Oriental Orthodoxy is the dominant religion in Armenia (94%), the ethnically Armenian Artsakh (98%) and  Ethiopia (44%, the total Christian population being roughly 67%).

Oriental Orthodoxy is especially the dominant religion in the two Ethiopian regions of Amhara (82%) and Tigray (95%), as well as the chartered city of Addis Ababa (75%). It is also important in Oromia Region (31%).

Oriental Orthodoxy is also one of two dominant religions in Eritrea (47%), especially in its highland regions Maekel Region (87%) and Debub Region (86%).

It is a significant minority religion in Egypt (10%), Sudan (5%, the total Christian population being 15%), Syria (3%, the total Christian population being 10-11% the rest being Greek Orthodox, Catholic and Church of the East), Lebanon (5%, the total Christian population being 40%) and Kerala, India (1%, the total Christian population being around 18%).

Predominantly Oriental Orthodox Christian countries
Oriental Orthodoxy is the largest single religious faith in:

Countries with a high percentage of Oriental Orthodox Christians include:

Oriental Orthodox churches in full communion
 The Coptic Orthodox Church
 The British Orthodox Church in the United Kingdom
 The French Coptic Orthodox Church in France
 The Armenian Apostolic Church
 The Holy See of Cilicia
 The Armenian Patriarchate of Constantinople
 The Armenian Patriarchate of Jerusalem
 The Ethiopian Orthodox Tewahedo Church
 The Eritrean Orthodox Tewahedo Church
 The Syriac Orthodox Church
 The  Jacobite Syrian Christian Church in India
 The Malankara Orthodox Syrian Church

Statistics

See also
 Christianity by country
 List of Christian denominations by number of members

Other religions:
 Islam by country
 Jews by country
 Hinduism by country
 Buddhism by country
 Irreligion by country

General:
 List of religious populations

References 

 
History of Oriental Orthodoxy